Ruplizumab (trade name Antova) is a humanized monoclonal antibody intended for the treatment of rheumatic diseases like systemic lupus erythematosus and lupus nephritis. A study showed that the drug was associated with life-threatening thromboembolisms, while another study only found thrombocytopenia.

References 

Monoclonal antibodies